I Love the New Sky is the fifth studio album by English musician Tim Burgess. It was released on 22 May 2020 under Bella Union.

Commercial performance
The album ranked at No.31 on the UK Albums Chart

Critical reception
I Love the New Sky was met with "generally favourable" reviews from critics. At Metacritic, which assigns a weighted average rating out of 100 to reviews from mainstream publications, this release received an average score of 79, based on 11 reviews. Aggregator Album of the Year gave the album 78 out of 100 based on 13 reviews.

Track listing

Charts

References

2020 albums
Tim Burgess albums
Bella Union albums